Xanbulaq, Gürcüvan (?-2018) (also, Gyurdzhivan, Gyurdzhyuvan, and Gyurzhyuvan) is a village and municipality in the Agsu Rayon of Azerbaijan.  It has a population of 300. The municipality consists of the villages of Gürcüvan, Kəndaxan, Yenikənd, Hinqar, Girdə, and Kövlüc.

References 

Populated places in Agsu District